Gipsy Lane Pit is a  geological Site of Special Scientific Interest in Leicester. It is a Geological Conservation Review site.

This site is important to geologists for its Triassic stratigraphy, and to mineralogists as it is rich in sulphides, some of which are unidentified and imperfectly understood compounds. Natural England describes the site's interest as "unique in Britain, and possibly internationally".

The stie is private land with no public access.

References

Sites of Special Scientific Interest in Leicestershire
Geological Conservation Review sites